Priorities on Parade is a 1942 American musical film directed by Albert S. Rogell and written by Art Arthur. The film stars Ann Miller, Johnny Johnston, Jerry Colonna, Betty Jane Rhodes, Barbara Jo Allen, Harry Barris, Eddie Quillan and Dave Willock. The film was released on July 23, 1942, by Paramount Pictures.

Plot
During World War II, a dance band and other entertainers go to work in a munitions factory to help the war effort and stage a morale-boosting show.

Cast
Ann Miller as Donna D'Arcy
Johnnie Johnston as Johnny Draper
Jerry Colonna as Jeep Jackson
Betty Jane Rhodes as Lee Davis 
Barbara Jo Allen as Mariposa Ginsbotham 
Harry Barris as Harvey Erkimer
Eddie Quillan as Sticks O'Hara
Dave Willock as Push Gasper
Nick Cockrane as Frank
Rod Cameron as Stage Manager
Arthur Loft as E. V. Hartley
The Debonnaires as Specialty Act 
William Forrest as Col. Reeves
Warren Ashe as Psych. Test Administrator
Lee Shumway as Jones

References

External links 
 

1942 films
1940s English-language films
American musical films
1942 musical films
Paramount Pictures films
Films directed by Albert S. Rogell
Films produced by Sol C. Siegel
American black-and-white films
1940s American films
English-language musical films